Charles Assmann (born February 27, 1972) is a former Canadian football linebacker who played six seasons in the Canadian Football League with the Toronto Argonauts, Edmonton Eskimos, Calgary Stampeders and Ottawa Renegades. He played CIS football at the University of Guelph.

References

External links
Just Sports Stats
1999 trading card 2002 20032004

Living people
1972 births
Players of Canadian football from Ontario
Canadian football linebackers
Guelph Gryphons football players
Toronto Argonauts players
Edmonton Elks players
Calgary Stampeders players
Ottawa Renegades players
Sportspeople from Richmond Hill, Ontario